Joe Hill (October 7, 1879 – November 19, 1915), born Joel Emmanuel Hägglund and also known as Joseph Hillström, was a Swedish-American labor activist, songwriter, and member of the Industrial Workers of the World (IWW, familiarly called the "Wobblies"). A native Swedish speaker, he learned English during the early 1900s, while working various jobs from New York to San Francisco. Hill, an immigrant worker frequently facing unemployment and underemployment, became a popular songwriter and cartoonist for the union. His most famous songs include "The Preacher and the Slave" (in which he coined the phrase "pie in the sky"), "The Tramp", "There Is Power in a Union", "The Rebel Girl", and "Casey Jones—the Union Scab", which express the harsh and combative life of itinerant workers, and call for workers to organize their efforts to improve working conditions.

In 1914, John G. Morrison, a Salt Lake City area grocer and former policeman, and his son were shot and killed by two men. The same evening, Hill arrived at a doctor's office with a gunshot wound, and briefly mentioned a fight over a woman. He refused to explain further, even after he was accused of the grocery store murders on the basis of his injury. Hill was convicted of the murders in a controversial trial. Following an unsuccessful appeal, political debates, and international calls for clemency from high-profile figures and workers' organizations, Hill was executed in November 1915. After his death, he was memorialized by several folk songs. His life and death have inspired books and poetry.

The identity of the woman and the rival who supposedly caused Hill's injury, though frequently speculated upon, remained mostly conjecture for nearly a century. William M. Adler's 2011 biography of Hill presents information about a possible alibi, which was never introduced at the trial. According to Adler, Hill and his friend and countryman Otto Appelquist were rivals for the attention of 20-year-old Hilda Erickson, a member of the family with whom the two men were lodging. In a recently discovered letter, Erickson confirmed her relationship with the two men and the rivalry between them. The letter indicates that when she first discovered Hill was injured, he explained to her that Appelquist had shot him, apparently out of jealousy.

Early life
Joel Emmanuel Hägglund was born 1879 in Gävle (then spelled Gefle), a city in the province of Gästrikland, Sweden. He was the third child in a family of nine, where three children died young. His father, Olof, worked as a conductor on the Gefle-Dala railway line. Olof (1846–1887) died at the age of 41, and his death meant economic disaster for the family. Joe's mother Margareta Catharina (1844–1902) did, however, succeed in keeping the family together until she died when Joel was in his early twenties.

The Hägglund family home still stands in Gävle at the address Nedre Bergsgatan 28, in Gamla Stan, the Old Town.  it houses a museum and the Joe Hill-gården, which hosts cultural events.

In his late teens-early twenties, Joel fell seriously ill with skin and glandular tuberculosis, and underwent extensive treatment in Stockholm. In October 1902, when nearly 23, Joel and his brother Paul Elias Hägglund (1877–1955) immigrated to the United States. Hill became an itinerant laborer, moving from New York City to Cleveland, and eventually to the west coast. He was in San Francisco at the time of the 1906 earthquake.

IWW

By this time using the name Joe or Joseph Hillstrom (possibly because of anti-union blacklisting), he joined the Industrial Workers of the World (IWW) or Wobblies around 1910, when working on the docks in San Pedro, California. In late 1910 he wrote a letter to the IWW newspaper Industrial Worker, identifying himself as a member of the IWW local chapter in Portland, Oregon.

He rose in the IWW organization and traveled widely, organizing workers under the IWW banner, writing political songs and satirical poems, and making speeches. Joe Hill and Harry McClintock were Spellbinders for the IWW and would show up as they did at the Tucker Utah strike on June 14, 1913 (Salt Lake Tribune). He shortened his pseudonym to "Joe Hill" as the pen-name under which his songs, cartoons and other writings appeared. His songs frequently appropriated familiar melodies from popular songs and hymns of the time.  He coined the phrase "pie in the sky", which appeared in his song "The Preacher and the Slave" (a parody of the hymn "In the Sweet By-and-By"). Other notable songs written by Hill include "The Tramp", "There Is Power in a Union", "The Rebel Girl", and "Casey Jones—the Union Scab".

Trial
As an itinerant worker, Hill moved around the west, hopping freight trains, going from job to job. By the end of 1913, he was working as a laborer at the Silver King Mine in Park City, Utah, not far from Salt Lake City.

On January 10, 1914, John G. Morrison and his son Arling were killed in their Salt Lake City grocery store by two armed intruders masked in red bandanas. The police first thought it was a crime of revenge, for nothing had been stolen and the elder Morrison had been a police officer, possibly creating many enemies.  On the same evening, Joe Hill appeared on the doorstep of a local doctor, with a bullet wound through the left lung.  Hill said that he had been shot in an argument over a woman, whom he refused to name. The doctor reported that Hill was armed with a pistol.  Considering Morrison's past as a police officer, several men he had arrested were at first considered suspects; 12 people were arrested in the case before Hill was arrested and charged with the murder. A red bandana was found in Hill's room. The pistol purported to be in Hill's possession at the doctor's office was not found.  Hill resolutely denied that he was involved in the robbery and killing of Morrison. He said that when he was shot, his hands were over his head, and the bullet hole in his coat—four inches below the exit wound in his back—seemed to support this claim. Hill did not testify at his trial, but his lawyers pointed out that four other people were treated for bullet wounds in Salt Lake City that same night, and that the lack of robbery and Hill's unfamiliarity with Morrison left him with no motive.

The prosecution, for its part, produced a dozen eyewitnesses who said that the killer resembled Hill, including 13-year-old Merlin Morrison, the victims' son, and a brother, who upon first seeing Hill said, "That's not him at all" but later identified him as the murderer. The jury took just a few hours to find him guilty of murder.

An appeal to the Utah Supreme Court was unsuccessful. Orrin N. Hilton, the lawyer representing Hill during the appeal, declared: "The main thing the state had on Hill was that he was a Wobbly and therefore sure to be guilty. Hill tried to keep the IWW out of [the trial] ... but the press fastened it upon him."

In a letter to the court, Hill continued to deny that the state had a right to inquire into the origins of his wound, leaving little doubt that the judges would affirm the conviction. Chief Justice Daniel Straup wrote that his unexplained wound was "a distinguishing mark", and that "the defendant may not avoid the natural and reasonable inferences of remaining silent." In an article for the socialist newspaper Appeal to Reason, Hill wrote: "Owing to the prominence of Mr. Morrison, there had to be a 'goat' [scapegoat] and the undersigned being, as they thought, a friendless tramp, a Swede, and worst of all, an IWW, had no right to live anyway, and was therefore duly selected to be 'the goat'."

The case turned into a major media event. President Woodrow Wilson, Helen Keller (the blind and deaf author and fellow-IWW member), the Swedish ambassador and the Swedish public all became involved in a bid for clemency. It generated international union attention, and critics charged that the trial and conviction were unfair. Despite the various petitions the governor at the time William Spry maintained  Hill's guilt. More recently, Utah Phillips considered Joe Hill to have been a political prisoner who was executed for his political agitation through songwriting.

In a biography published in 2011, William M. Adler concludes that Hill was probably innocent of murder, but also suggests that Hill came to see himself as worth more to the labor movement as a dead martyr than he was alive, and that this understanding may have influenced his decisions not to testify at the trial and subsequently to spurn all chances of a pardon. Adler reports that evidence pointed to early police suspect Frank Z. Wilson, and cites Hilda Erickson's letter, which states that Hill had told her he had been shot by her former fiancé.

Execution

Joe Hill was executed by firing squad on November 19, 1915 at Utah's Sugar House Prison. When Deputy Shettler, who led the firing squad, called out the sequence of commands preparatory to firing ("Ready, aim,") Hill shouted, "Fire—go on and fire!"

That same day, a dynamite bomb was discovered at the Tarrytown estate of John D. Archbold, President of the Standard Oil Company.  Police theorized the bomb was planted by anarchists and IWW radicals as a protest against Hill's execution. The bomb was discovered by a gardener, who found four sticks of dynamite, weighing a pound each, half hidden in a rut in a driveway fifty feet from the front entrance of the residence. The dynamite sticks were bound together by a length of wire, fitted with percussion caps, and wrapped with a piece of paper matching the color of the driveway, a path used by Archbold in going to or from his home by automobile.  The bomb was later defused by police.

Just prior to his execution, Hill had written to Bill Haywood, an IWW leader, saying, "Goodbye Bill. I die like a true blue rebel. Don't waste any time in mourning. Organize ... Could you arrange to have my body hauled to the state line to be buried? I don't want to be found dead in Utah."  Hunter S. Thompson asserted that Joe's last words were "Don't mourn.  Organize."

His last will, which was eventually set to music by Ethel Raim, founder of the group The Pennywhistlers, requested a cremation and reads:

Aftermath
Hill's body was sent to Chicago, where it was cremated; in accordance with his wishes, his ashes were placed into 600 small envelopes and sent around the world to be released to the winds. Delegates attending the Tenth Convention of the IWW in Chicago received envelopes November 19, 1916, one year to the day of Hill's execution (and not on May Day 1916 as Wobbly lore claims). The rest of the 600 envelopes were sent to IWW locals, Wobblies and sympathizers around the world on January 3, 1917.

In 1988, it was discovered that an envelope had been seized by the United States Post Office Department in 1917 because of its "subversive potential". The envelope, with a photo affixed, captioned "Joe Hill murdered by the capitalist class, Nov. 19, 1915", as well as its contents, was deposited at the National Archives. A story appeared in the United Auto Workers' magazine Solidarity and a small item followed it in The New Yorker magazine. Members of the IWW in Chicago quickly laid claim to the contents of the envelope.

After some negotiations, the last of Hill's ashes (but not the envelope that contained them) was turned over to the IWW in 1988. The weekly In These Times ran notice of the ashes and invited readers to suggest what should be done with them. Suggestions varied from enshrining them at the AFL–CIO headquarters in Washington, DC to Abbie Hoffman's suggestion that they be eaten by today's "Joe Hills" like Billy Bragg and Michelle Shocked. Bragg did indeed swallow a small bit of the ashes with some Union beer to wash it down, and for a time carried Shocked's share for the eventual completion of Hoffman's last prank. Bragg has since given Shocked's share to Otis Gibbs. The majority of the ashes were cast to the wind in the US, Canada, Sweden, Australia, and Nicaragua. The ashes sent to Sweden were only partly cast to the wind. The main part was interred in the wall of a union office in Landskrona, a minor city in the south of the country, with a plaque commemorating Hill. That room is now the reading room of the local city library.

One small packet of ashes was scattered at a 1989 ceremony which unveiled a monument to six unarmed IWW coal miners buried in Lafayette, Colorado, who had been machine-gunned by Colorado state police in 1927 in the Columbine Mine massacre. Until 1989 the graves of five of these men were unmarked. Another famous Wobbly, Carlos Cortez, scattered Joe Hill's ashes on the graves at the commemoration.

On the night of November 18, 1990, the Southeast Michigan IWW General Membership Branch hosted a gathering of "wobs" in a remote wooded area at which a dinner, followed by a bonfire, featured a reading of Hill's last will, "and then his ashes were released into the flames and carried up above the trees. ... The next day ... one wob collected a bowl full of ashes from the smoldering fire pit." At that event several IWW members consumed a portion of Hill's ashes before the rest was consigned to the fire.

To commemorate the 50th anniversary of the execution of Joe Hill, Philip S. Foner published a book, The Case of Joe Hill, about the trial and subsequent events, which concludes that the case was a miscarriage of justice.

Archival materials and legacy

Hill's handwritten last will and testament was uncovered in the first decade of the 21st century by archivist Michael Nash of the Tamiment Library and Robert F. Wagner Archives of New York University. Found in a box under a desk at the New York City headquarters of the Communist Party USA during a transfer of CPUSA archival materials to NYU, the document began with a couplet: "My will is easy to decide / For I have nothing to divide."

Additional archival materials were donated to the Walter P. Reuther Library by Carl XVI Gustaf of Sweden in 1976.

Influence and tributes

 Hill's exhortation, "Don't waste any time mourning. Organize!", often shortened to "Don't mourn -- organize!", has become a widely-used slogan of the political Left, especially after a defeat or death.
 Hill was memorialized in a tribute poem written about him c. 1930 by Alfred Hayes titled "I Dreamed I Saw Joe Hill Last Night", sometimes referred to simply as "Joe Hill". Hayes's lyrics were turned into a song in 1936 by Earl Robinson, who wrote in 1986, "'Joe Hill' was written in Camp Unity in the summer of 1936 in New York State, for a campfire program celebrating him and his songs ..." Hayes gave a copy of his poem to fellow camp staffer Robinson, who wrote the tune in 40 minutes.
 Paul Robeson and Pete Seeger often performed this song by Earl Robinson and are associated with it, along with Irish folk group The Dubliners. Joan Baez's Woodstock performance of "Joe Hill" in 1969 (documented in the 1970 film "Woodstock" and corresponding soundtrack album) is one of the best known recordings. She also recorded the song numerous times, including a live version on her 2005 album Bowery Songs. Scott Walker recorded a version for his album The Moviegoer. In May 2014, Bruce Springsteen and the E Street Band opened their concert in Tampa, Florida, with the song.
 The Swedish socialist leader Ture Nerman (1886–1969) wrote a biography of Joe Hill. For the project, Nerman did the first serious research about Hill's life story, including finding and interviewing Hill's family members in Sweden. Nerman, who was a poet himself, also translated most of Hill's songs into Swedish.
 Ralph Chaplin wrote a tribute poem/song called "Joe Hill" and referred to him in his song "Red November, Black November".
 Phil Ochs wrote and recorded a different, original song called "Joe Hill", using a traditional melody found in the song "John Hardy", which tells a much more detailed story of Joe Hill's life and death.
 Singer/songwriter Josh Joplin wrote and recorded a song entitled Joseph Hillstrom 1879–1915 as a tribute to Joe Hill for the self-titled debut album Among the Oak & Ash of his band.
 In 1990, Smithsonian Folkways released Don't Mourn — Organize!: Songs of Labor Songwriter Joe Hill. The compilation album featured the likes of Harry "Haywire Mac" McClintock, Cisco Houston, Paul Robeson, and Entertainment Workers IU630 I.W.W. performing Hill's songs, Billy Bragg and Si Kahn, and narrative interludes from Utah Phillips and Elizabeth Gurley Flynn.
 In 1990, Billy Bragg released his song "I Dreamed I Saw Phil Ochs Last Night", set to the melody of "I Dreamed I Saw Joe Hill Last Night", on his EP The Internationale.
 Wallace Stegner published a fictional biography called Joe Hill in 1950.
 Authors Stephen and Tabitha King named their second child Joseph Hillstrom King, after Joe Hill.
 Gibbs M. Smith wrote a biography, Joe Hill, later adapted for the 1971 movie Joe Hill (also known as The Ballad of Joe Hill) directed by Bo Widerberg. A novelization of the screenplay, released concurrently with the film by Tempo Books was written by John McDermott, under that byline, although, as a mainstream novelist, he had been previously known only by his pen name, J. M. Ryan.
 A chapter of John Dos Passos's novel 1919 is a stylized biography of Joe Hill.
 Thomas Babe's 1980 full-length play Salt Lake City Skyline retells the story of Joe Hill's trial.
 "Calling Joe Hill" by Ray Hearne is frequently performed by Roy Bailey, a British socialist folk singer.
 In 1995, the first "Raise Your Banners" festival of political song was held in Sheffield, inspired by the 80th anniversary of the death of Joe Hill. Sheffield Socialist choir which was formed in 1988 organised the event and performed an arrangement by Nigel Wright of the Earl Robinson song about Joe Hill. Since then the festival has been held roughly every two years.
 In 1980, Postverket, the Swedish postal service, issued a Joe Hill postage stamp.  Red on a white background with the lyrics in English "We'll have freedom, love and health/When the grand red flag is flying, In the Workers' Commonwealth."  The stamp cost SKr 1,70 which was the amount for airmail to the United States.
 Chumbawamba's song about Joe Hill, "By and By", appears on the 2005 album A Singsong and a Scrap. It incorporates the first stanza of Alfred Hayes' poem and is set to substantially the same melody as "The Preacher and the Slave".
 Track three on Mickey Hart's Mystery Box CD (2008) titled "Down The Road" makes reference to Joe Hill.
 Seattle composer and bandleader Wayne Horvitz created a musical tribute to Joe Hill in 2008. Joe Hill: 16 Actions for Orchestra, Voice and Soloist, which premiered at Meany Hall in Seattle, features the Northwest Sinfonia and guest soloists Bill Frisell, Robin Holcomb, Danny Barnes, and Rinde Eckert.
 Singer-songwriter Justin Townes Earle's 2009 song "They Killed John Henry" references folk heroes such as John Henry and contains a verse about Joe Hill.
 Otis Gibbs made the Joe Hill's Ashes album in 2010.
 In October 2011, activist/songwriter Si Kahn's one-man play Joe Hill's Last Will, featuring Hill's catalogue of songs and starring singer John McCutcheon, was produced by Main Stage West in Sebastopol, California. The one-person musical was performed by McCutcheon several times, including a show in Salt Lake City on November 19, 2015, the 100th anniversary of Joe Hill's death. The centennial event was recorded on video and audio.
 In 2012, Anti-Flag released The General Strike, an album including a song titled "1915" telling the story of Joe Hill.
 In 2013, trombonist Roswell Rudd recorded a four-movement tribute to Joe Hill with the NYC Labor Chorus and others as part of his Trombone for Lovers album.
 In 2003, on the album Blackout, Dropkick Murphys performed a song quoting the beliefs of Joe Hill and using the phrase "pie in the sky". The song was titled "Worker's Song" and was composed by Ed Pickford. It was also performed by Dick Gaughan, Scottish folk singer and socialist.
 In 2014, Finnish rap-artist Paleface referenced "Joel Hägglund's ashes" in his song "Mull' on lupa" (I Have a Permit/I Am Allowed).
 In 2016, Shelby Bottom Duo released the CD Joe Hill Roadshow as a companion to their multimedia presentation A Musical History of Joe Hill and the Early Labor Movement.
In 2019 Joe Hill is a minor character in the novel Deep River by Karl Marlantes
 In 2020, Dubamix pays tribute to Joe Hill, in the Album "Camarades" with his personal version of "Rebel Girl".

See also

 Don't mourn, organize!
 List of worker deaths in United States labor disputes
 Wesley Everest (December 29, 1890 – November 11, 1919) was lynched during the Centralia massacre

References

Recordings of songs
Cover albums of his songs:
 Joe Glazer, Songs of Joe Hill, Smithsonian Folkways, 1954
 Bucky Halker, Anywhere But Utah: Songs of Joe Hill, Revolting Records, 2015

Further reading
 
 
 "The Man Who Never Died", A Play about Joe Hill, with Notes on Joe Hill and His Times, by Barrie Stavis, New York: Haven Press, 1954. The "notes" are actually a carefully researched, 116-page history of the period, with detailed analysis of the trial of Joe Hill; the notes include photographs of people, events, and documents. The play was produced in New York City off-broadway at the Jan Hus Play House in 1958. The revised play and compressed notes were published in a second version of this book under the same title, published at Cranbury NJ: A. S. Barnes, 1972.
 Davidson, Jared (2011). Remains to be Seen: Tracing Joe Hill's ashes in New Zealand. Wellington: Rebel Press, 2011. 
 Philips, Utah and Difranco, Ani. Fellow Workers. Righteous Babe Records, NY, 1999.
 Nolan, Dean & Thompson, Fred. Joe Hill: IWW Songwriter. Montreal: Kersplebedeb.
 Gibbs Smith. Joe Hill—The Man and the Myth.
 Melvyn Dubofsky. We Shall Be All: A History of the Industrial Workers of the World. Quadrangle, 1969.
 Mark Leier. Where the Fraser River Flows: The Industrial Workers of the World in British Columbia. New Star Books, 1989.
 Buhle, Paul and Schulman, Nicole, eds. Wobblies! A Graphic History of the Industrial Workers of the World. NY: Verso, 2005.
 Union Song by The Nightwatchman

External links

Video
 Joe Hill Documentary produced by PBS affiliate KUED.
  Discussion with William Adler, author of The Man Who Never Died: The Life, Times, and Legacy of Joe Hill, American Labor Icon on C-SPAN from October 29, 2011.
 Joe Hill documentary (Swedish with English subtitles)

Articles
 Site at KUED7 about the PBS Joe Hill documentary from 2000
 The Joe Hill Project—University of Utah

YouTube Music
Songs of Joe Hill, Joe Glazer, 1954, 10 songs, 22 minutes.
Don't Mourn—Organize!: Songs of Labor Songwriter Joe Hill, Various Artists, 1990, 15 songs, 54 minutes. 

Smithsonian Folkways Recordings
 Songs of Joe Hill. Can purchase a digital download of the recording, or alternatively a CD. (Music on the album also available on ad supported YouTube Music for free)     
 Don't Mourn—Organize!: Songs of Labor Songwriter Joe Hill. Can purchase a digital download of the recording released in 1990, or alternatively a CD. Can also download a PDF file of the liner notes for free. (Music on the album also available on ad supported YouTube Music for free) 

Songs
 The Songs of Joe Hill at Folk Archive.
 Lyrics, sheet music, and audio files at Political Folk Music (About).

University of Utah Special Collections
 Joe Hill photograph collection, 1914–1990
 Joe Hill Organizing Committee records, 1914–1991
 Joe Hill Conference photograph collection, 1915–1990s

County Museum of Gävleborg, Sweden
 

Internet Archive
 Songs of the Workers to Fan the Flames of Discontent—IWW songbook
 Joe Hill melodies
 Swedish labor songs
 Songs of the Wobblies LP
 "Joe Hill": song by Alfred Hayes and Earl Robinson
 

1879 births
1915 deaths
People from Gävle
American folklore
American male songwriters
Hoboes
Industrial Workers of the World leaders
American trade unionists of Swedish descent
People executed for murder
People executed by Utah by firing squad
20th-century executions by Utah
Swedish people executed abroad
Deaths by firearm in Utah
People convicted of murder by Utah
Swedish emigrants to the United States
Executed Swedish people
20th-century executions of American people